Dame Esther Louise Rantzen  (born 22 June 1940) is an English journalist and television presenter, who presented the BBC television series That's Life! for 21 years, from 1973 until 1994. She works with various charitable causes and founded the charities ChildLine, promoting child protection, which she set up in 1986, and The Silver Line, designed to combat loneliness in older people's lives, which she set up in November 2012.

Rantzen has been recognised for her contribution to television and society. She was awarded an OBE for services to broadcasting in 1991, a CBE for services to children in 2006, and in the 2015 New Year Honours, was made a Dame for services to children and older people through ChildLine and The Silver Line. She is Patron for the charity Operation Encompass and a Trustee for the charity Silver Stories both charities created and run by husband and wife David Carney-Haworth OBE and Elisabeth Carney-Haworth OBE.

Early life and family
Rantzen was born in Berkhamsted, Hertfordshire, England, to Katherine Flora Rantzen (née Leverson, 1911–2005) and Henry Barnato Rantzen (1902–1992). Her family is Jewish. She has one younger sister, Priscilla N. Taylor. She attended Buckley Country Day School in New York, leaving in 1950. She was educated at North London Collegiate School, an all-girls private school in Edgware, North London. She studied English at Somerville College, Oxford, where one of her tutors was Mary Lascelles. At Oxford she performed with the Oxford University Dramatic Society (OUDS), became Secretary of the Experimental Theatre Club (ETC) and joined the Oxford Theatre Group, performing in Oxford and Edinburgh.

Rantzen was the subject of an episode of Who Do You Think You Are? on 3 September 2008. Her paternal line was traced back, as far as the 1760s, to an established Jewish neighbourhood in Warsaw. Tracing Rantzen's forebears was greatly helped by the rarity of the surname "Rantzen" (even in Warsaw) and the survival of records in Warsaw. In the late 1850s, her great-great-grandfather emigrated to Britain and settled, as a cap-maker, in Spitalfields, a slum district of London's East End. Rantzen's great-grandfather moved to a more comfortable neighbourhood with the help of his brother-in-law, Barney Barnato (born Barnett Isaacs), who had become extremely wealthy as a diamond merchant in South Africa. Her father's middle name was Barnato.

On her wealthy maternal side, Rantzen's great-grandfather, Montague Leverson, was one of the founders of the West London Synagogue. Montague Leverson was the maternal grandfather of British composer Gerald Finzi. Rantzen is also related to Ada Leverson, a British writer and friend of Oscar Wilde, who was portrayed by Zoë Wanamaker in the 1997 film Wilde. She is first cousin once removed of the novelist and translator Michael Meyer.

Career

BBC
After training in secretarial skills, Rantzen was recruited by BBC Radio as a trainee studio manager. She began her television career as a clerk in the programme planning department, then obtained her first production job working as a researcher on the BBC1 late-night satire programme BBC-3 (1965–66). Having worked as a researcher on a number of current affairs programmes, she moved to the award-winning BBC2 documentary series Man Alive in the mid-1960s.

In 1968, Rantzen, at the time a researcher for Braden's Week (hosted by Bernard Braden), became a presenter because the producer of the programme decided to put the researchers onscreen. Braden decided to return to his native Canada in 1972, to present a similar TV show there; the following year, the BBC replaced Braden's Week with That's Life! with Rantzen as the main presenter.

That's Life! ran on BBC1 for 21 years from 1973 to 1994, becoming one of the most popular shows on British television, reaching audiences of more than 18 million. During that time, it expanded the traditional role of the consumer programme from simply exposing faulty washing machines and dodgy salesmen, to investigating life-and-death issues, such as a campaign for more organ donors, which featured Ben Hardwick, a two-year-old dying of liver disease whose only hope was a transplant, and the investigation of Crookham Court boarding school near Newbury, described as "dirty and depressing" with unsatisfactory teaching standards, the headmaster of which was a paedophile who employed several paedophile teachers: the school was closed and the head and a member of staff were convicted of sexual offences against pupils as a result of That's Life! publicising the issues.

To lighten some of these very serious themes and issues, That's Life! also had some humorous spots, such as readings of amusing misprints sent in by viewers; it also featured comic songs that often matched the theme of each show, specially written and performed by artists such as Lynsey De Paul, Victoria Wood, Richard Stilgoe and Jake Thackray.

In 1976, Rantzen devised the documentary series The Big Time, which launched Sheena Easton's singing career.

ChildLine

That's Life! was influential in many different ways, not least in the introduction of the videolink for child witnesses in court procedures, and it was responsible for the launch of ChildLine in 1986, the first national helpline for children in danger or distress. Rantzen had suggested the Childwatch programme to BBC1 Controller Michael Grade after the death of a toddler who had starved to death, locked in a bedroom. The aim of the programme was to find better ways of detecting children at risk of abuse; to that end, viewers of That's Life! who had themselves experienced cruelty as children were asked to take part in a survey detailing the circumstances of their abuse.

Rantzen suggested that after that edition of That's Life!, the BBC should open a helpline for children, in case any young viewers suffering current abuse wished to ring in to ask for help. The helpline was open for 48 hours, during which it was swamped with calls, mainly from children suffering sexual abuse they had never been able to disclose to anyone else. This gave Rantzen the idea for a specific helpline for children in distress or danger, to be open 24/7 throughout the year, the first of its kind in the world. The Childwatch team consulted child care professionals, who agreed that children would use such a helpline, but said it would be impossible to create. Nevertheless, the team obtained funding from the Department of Health and the Variety Club of Great Britain, both of which donated £25,000. Ian Skipper OBE, a noted philanthropist who had already helped Rantzen set up a special fund in memory of Ben Hardwick, agreed to underwrite the helpline's running costs for the first year. Rantzen and the team went to BT to ask for premises for the charity and for a simple freephone number, both of which were provided.

The Childwatch programme screened on 30 October 1986 and, based on the results of the survey, launched ChildLine with a specially written jingle (by B. A. Robertson) which featured the free phone number 0800 1111. On that first night in October 1986, fifty thousand attempted calls were made to the helpline. ChildLine now has twelve bases around the UK, including two in Northern Ireland, two in Scotland and two in Wales. The NSPCC merged with ChildLine in 2006, enabling it to expand in an effort to meet demand. The helpline has now been copied in 150 countries around the world.

The Silver Line

In 2013, Rantzen set up The Silver Line, a charity to benefit elderly people, by combating isolation and loneliness, to provide information and advice and to offer a free confidential helpline. In addition, The Silver Line offers a telephone befriending service, in which trained volunteers conducting remote work make regular weekly calls to older people. It also offers Silver Letters and conference calls, discussion groups called Silver Circles.

Later career
In 1988, Rantzen created a television series called Hearts of Gold, celebrating people who had performed unsung acts of outstanding kindness or courage. Its theme tune was written by her close friend Lynsey De Paul, and was released as a single.

After That's Life! finished its 21-year run in 1994, she presented her own talk show, Esther, on BBC Two from 1994 to 2002.

In 2006, Rantzen took part in the BBC Two programmes Would Like to Meet and Excuse My French, and was selected to present a new consumer affairs show with former Watchdog presenter Lynn Faulds Wood, under the title Old Dogs New Tricks. She made a documentary for ITV called Winton's Children about Sir Nicholas Winton, who (as was first revealed on That's Life!) had rescued a generation of Czech children from the holocaust and was later nominated for the Nobel Peace Prize. After the death of Rantzen's husband, film-maker Desmond Wilcox, she made a landmark programme on palliative care, How to Have a Good Death, for BBC Two. Recently she has campaigned on behalf of hospice care and better care for the elderly and terminally ill. She has also campaigned to raise awareness of ME/CFS (chronic fatigue syndrome), as her eldest daughter Emily has suffered from the condition. She created the 'Children of Courage' segment for the BBC's Children in Need programme.

Rantzen was for a time a director of That's Media, which provides local TV programmes. In 2016, she was made an Honorary Fellow of Somerville College, Oxford.

In addition to her television career, as a patron or vice-president of 55 charities, she mainly concentrates on working for children, vulnerable older people and disabled people. Much of her voluntary effort is for ChildLine as a volunteer counsellor on the helpline, and as a fund-raiser and spokesperson for children, and latterly working to set up the new helpline for isolated and vulnerable older people. ChildLine currently has 12 centres around the UK, 1,500 volunteer counsellors and answers around a million calls and on-line contacts from children each year. Rantzen chaired ChildLine's Board of Trustees for twenty years, and since ChildLine merged with the NSPCC in 2006, she has served as a Trustee of the NSPCC, as well as being President of ChildLine. In 2013, she also became the Vice-President of Revitalise, a charity providing those with disabilities, and their carers, with short breaks and holidays. Rantzen is also patron of Erosh, a national charity which promotes good quality sheltered and retirement housing and provides resources for its members who support older people.

Rantzen also contributes the problem page "Ask Esther" in the children's newspaper First News.

She appeared in the 2008 series of ITV show I'm a Celebrity...Get Me Out of Here!, and was the fifth celebrity to leave the camp. She has been the face of the Accident Advice Helpline since 2003.

In 2016, she was in the first episode of Celebrity First Dates.

In 2018, she presented a new Channel 5 consumer advice show called Esther Rantzen’s House Trap, a 4-part series similar to BBC's long-running Watchdog programme, with hidden cameras trying to trap rogue traders in the homes of a number of undercover actors. Unlike Watchdog, these actors were all people of an advanced age with each episode focusing on a different trade, such as locksmiths, where older people were likely to being preyed upon.

Guest appearances
Celebrity Stars in Their Eyes (4 May 2002) – Contestant, as Edith Piaf
Celebrity Cash in the Attic – Contestant
Pointless Celebrities (28 April 2012) – Contestant
Piers Morgan's Life Stories (22 February 2013) 
Pointless: Children in Need Special (15 November 2013) – Contestant with Terry Wogan
Celebrity Antiques Road Trip (17 September 2014)
The Chase: Celebrity Special (27 September 2014) – Contestant
Sunday Brunch (15 March 2015)
The Box (2015)

Political career
On 26 May 2009, on Stephen Rhodes's BBC Three Counties Breakfast Show, Rantzen announced her intention to stand as an independent candidate for Parliament, if the incumbent Labour MP Margaret Moran stood for Luton South again. This statement was made against the backdrop of the Parliamentary expenses scandal and Moran's expense claims for £23,000 to eliminate dry rot in her second home in Southampton. Two days later, Moran announced she would not stand at the next general election, but Rantzen said she was still considering standing herself and confirmed her candidacy on 28 July 2009. Rantzen stood for election in Luton South against eleven other candidates, of whom four were independent. At the May 2010 election, Rantzen came fourth with 4.4% of the vote, behind the three main parties. In accordance with UK parliamentary electoral process, Rantzen lost her deposit, as only candidates receiving over 5% of the total votes cast have their deposit returned. Labour Party candidate Gavin Shuker won the seat with 34.9% of the vote, the Conservatives got 29.4% and the Liberal Democrats 22.7%.

In August 2014, Rantzen was one of 200 public figures who were signatories to a letter to The Guardian expressing their hope that Scotland would vote against independence from the United Kingdom in the referendum on that issue.

Savile child abuse allegations
In Exposure: The Other Side of Jimmy Savile, broadcast on 3 October 2012, Rantzen, after seeing the interviews the programme contains, supported the women allegedly abused by the then late BBC broadcaster Jimmy Savile.

She told Channel 4 News: "If anybody had had concrete evidence, I think and hope the police would have been called in. But all they had was gossip – and gossip isn't evidence."

Abuse campaigner Shy Keenan, writing in The Sun newspaper, subsequently claimed that, using a different name, she had told Rantzen 18 years earlier of allegations that she had heard about Savile. Rantzen has denied hearing specific allegations and said she had no recollection of a conversation with Keenan.

Writing for The Daily Telegraph before the broadcast, Katy Brand also criticised Rantzen for failing to act on rumours she had heard about Savile. Pete Saunders, chief executive of the National Association for People Abused in Childhood, at Keenan's request, temporarily asked for all references to Rantzen to be removed from the charity's website, but subsequently defended Rantzen and said she would continue as a patron.

Personal life
In 1966, at the age of 26, Rantzen had an affair with the Scottish politician Nicholas Fairbairn. She wrote:

In 1968, Rantzen started an affair with Desmond Wilcox, who was the head of her department and married to Rantzen's friend Patsy who also worked at the BBC. After several years they decided to live together, and informed BBC management of their relationship. Management's solution was to move the entire production team of That's Life! out of Wilcox's department. The new arrangement meant that Rantzen and Patsy were now working in the same department, embarrassing Rantzen and causing further pain to Patsy. Patsy Wilcox had always refused to divorce her husband, but agreed when Rantzen became pregnant. After Rantzen and Wilcox married in December 1977, BBC management moved her back into the General Features department run by him.

By that time, That's Life! was achieving huge audience ratings and reaching the number one position, gaining more viewers than Coronation Street. This created tension among colleagues in General Features, who ascribed the success of the programme to Wilcox's relationship with Rantzen. They complained to management, quoting the BBC's regulation that husbands and wives should not work in the same department.

As a result, Wilcox resigned, and set up his own independent production company, making award-winning documentaries such as The Visit, which included a series of programmes about The Boy David. For these, as well as previous films, he received many international awards, including the Grierson Life-Time Achievement Award in 2001. Wilcox and Rantzen had three children – Miriam (formerly known as Emily, b. 1978), Rebecca (b. 1980), and Joshua (b. 1981).

In 2001, Patsy's daughter Cassandra Wilcox gave an interview in response to comments Rantzen had made about Patsy in her autobiography, alleging amongst other things that Rantzen had long harboured animosity towards Patsy.

On 29 January 2023, Rantzen announced that she had been diagnosed with lung cancer. In a statement, Rantzen said, "In the last few weeks I have discovered that I am suffering from lung cancer which has now spread. At the moment I am undergoing various tests, to assess the best treatment [...] I have decided not to keep this secret any more because I find it difficult to skulk around various hospitals wearing an unconvincing disguise, and because I would rather you heard the facts from me. [...] As I am sure you will understand, while I am awaiting the results of the tests, I am unable to answer questions. Thanks to the extraordinary skills of the medical profession there are wonderful new treatments, so I am remaining optimistic."

Honours
Rantzen was appointed Officer of the Order of the British Empire (OBE) in the 1991 New Year Honours for services to broadcasting, Commander of the Order of the British Empire (CBE) in the 2006 Birthday Honours for services to children and young people, and Dame Commander of the Order of the British Empire (DBE) in the 2015 New Year Honours for services to children and older people through ChildLine and The Silver Line.

Rantzen has also received a number of professional awards, including the Lifetime Achievement Award from the Women in Film and Television organisation, the Royal Television Society's Special Judges' Award for Journalism, their Fellowship, and Membership of their Hall of Fame. She was the first woman to receive a Dimbleby Award from BAFTA for factual presentation. She received the Snowdon Award for services to disabled people.

Arms
On 31 May 2018 she was granted arms by the College of Arms, through Letters Patent of Garter and Clarenceux Kings of Arms.

References

Sources

External links
Official website

Esther Rantzen at the British Film Institute
interview on British Entertainment History Project

1940 births
Living people
Alumni of Somerville College, Oxford
BBC television presenters
Buckley Country Day School alumni
Dames Commander of the Order of the British Empire
English Jews
English journalists
English people of Polish-Jewish descent
English television presenters
English television talk show hosts
Fellows of Somerville College, Oxford
I'm a Celebrity...Get Me Out of Here! (British TV series) participants
Independent British political candidates
National Society for the Prevention of Cruelty to Children people
People educated at North London Collegiate School
People from Berkhamsted